Brian Martin (born January 19, 1974) is an American luger who competed from 1990 to 2010. Competing in four Winter Olympics, he won two medals in the men's doubles event with a silver in 2002 and a bronze in 1998. He was born in Palo Alto, California.

Martin also won nine medals at the FIL World Luge Championships with two silvers (Mixed team: 2004, 2005) and seven bronzes (Men's doubles: 1999, 2000, 2004, 2005, 2007, 2009; Mixed team: 2001).

Martin won the overall Luge World Cup men's doubles title three times (199798, 199899, 200203).

He announced his retirement on 17 March 2010.

Martin graduated from the University of California, Berkeley in 2014.

References

 
 FIL-Luge profile
 
 
 
 
 
 USA Luge profile of Grimmette and Martin

External links 
 
 
 

1974 births
American male lugers
Living people
Sportspeople from Santa Clara County, California
Lugers at the 1998 Winter Olympics
Lugers at the 2002 Winter Olympics
Lugers at the 2006 Winter Olympics
Lugers at the 2010 Winter Olympics
Olympic lugers of the United States
Olympic silver medalists for the United States in luge
Olympic bronze medalists for the United States in luge
Medalists at the 2002 Winter Olympics
Medalists at the 1998 Winter Olympics
University of California, Berkeley alumni